U.S. Route 460 (US 460) is a spur route of U.S. Route 60. It currently runs for 655 miles (1,054 km) from Norfolk, Virginia, at its parent route U.S. Route 60 at Ocean View to Frankfort, Kentucky, intersecting its parent route once again. It passes through the states of Virginia, West Virginia, and Kentucky.  It goes through the cities and towns of Norfolk, Portsmouth, Suffolk, Petersburg, Farmville, Lynchburg, Roanoke, Christiansburg, Blacksburg, Tazewell, and Grundy, in Virginia; Princeton and Bluefield in West Virginia; and Pikeville, Georgetown, and Frankfort in Kentucky.

The section from Interstate 81 at Christiansburg, Virginia, to U.S. Route 23 in Pikeville, Kentucky, is Corridor Q in the Appalachian Development Highway System. The portion improved under this system is unfinished between Grundy, Virginia, and Pikeville.

US 460 is a major east–west highway in Virginia. It is a major thoroughfare through southern Hampton Roads and connects the area to Petersburg. US 460 connects Lynchburg to Roanoke.  US 460 is paired with US 221 between Bedford and Roanoke and with US 11 between Salem and Christiansburg.  It is also the primary east–west roadway in the northern part of Southwest Virginia between Christiansburg and the Kentucky border; several miles near Bluefield pass through West Virginia.

Route description

Kentucky

US 460 now begins when it splits from US 60 a few miles east of downtown Frankfort.  It is a winding two-lane highway with no shoulders and intersects US 62 and I-75 at Georgetown.  It proceeds to Paris, where it serves as the town's "Main Street" and intersects US 27 and US 68.  The next major intersection is with I-64 in Mount Sterling.  It proceeds through Frenchburg and West Liberty.  In Salyersville, the Mountain Parkway ends by merging onto it.  It is a 3-lane highway for 14 miles and then it merges with US 23 in Paintsville.  US 460 East follows US-23 South through Prestonsburg and Pikeville. The route enters the southwestern part of Virginia.

Virginia and West Virginia

U.S. Route 460 runs east–west through the southern part of  Virginia.  It has two separate pieces in Virginia, joined by a relatively short section in West Virginia.  Most of US 460 is a four-lane divided highway.

US 460 from Interstate 81 at Christiansburg west to Pikeville, Kentucky, including the piece in West Virginia, is Corridor Q of the Appalachian Development Highway System. From West Virginia east to I-81, US 460 is also part of the proposed Interstate 73.

History
The earliest origins of this road were as part of the track once known as the Trader's Path, a Virginia colonial trail dating from the 17th century that led from Augusta County to present-day Roanoke.
Before it was commissioned as a federally designated route in the late 1940s, US 460 was designated as Kentucky Route 4 from the western Virginia state line near Grundy to Millard, Kentucky. It was Kentucky Route 40 from Paintsville to Lexington.

In the pre-Interstate era, US 460 was a major highway, passing from Frankfort through Louisville, Kentucky and Evansville, Indiana, and ending in St. Louis, Missouri, after crossing the MacArthur Bridge.

Interstate 64 has supplanted most of old US 460 as a more direct route. The stretch through Indiana and Illinois was eliminated in November 1976. Old US 460 has been redesignated in these areas as parts of State Road 66 and State Road 62 in Indiana; and part of Illinois Route 15, Illinois Route 142, and Illinois Route 14 in that state. However, its parent route, US 60 has not been supplanted by I-64 and converted to a state highway in the greater Louisville area.

Many years after the road's elimination in Indiana in 1977, some older residents and even businesses along what is now Indiana State Road 62 still refer to the road as "Highway 460." Older billboards retain that designation in the St. Meinrad area. Some current telephone books also contain listings for those living on "Hwy 460."

When Fishtrap Lake was created in Pike County, Kentucky, US 460 was realigned to its current route from Salyersville to Paintsville. The former US 460 leading to the lake is now Kentucky Routes 1499 and 1789. The part between Paintsville and Millard remained U.S. Highway 23 and Kentucky Route 80.

Major intersections
Kentucky
  in Frankfort
  in Georgetown
  in Georgetown
  in Georgetown
  in Paris
  in Mt. Sterling
  in Mt. Sterling. The highways travel concurrently through Mt. Sterling.
  in Paintsville. The highways travel concurrently to Pikeville.
  in Pikeville. The highways travel concurrently through Pikeville.
Virginia
  in Grundy
  in Claypool Hill. The highways travel concurrently to Bluefield.
West Virginia
  in Bluefield. The highways travel concurrently through Bluefield.
  northeast of Bluefield. The highways travel concurrently to southwest of Princeton.
  east-southeast of Princeton
Virginia
  in Rich Creek
 Appalachian Trail across the New River near Pearisburg
  in Christiansburg
  in Christiansburg. The highways travel concurrently through Christiansburg.
  in Christiansburg. US 11/US 460 travels concurrently to Salem.
  in Roanoke
  in Roanoke. US 221/US 460 travels concurrently to Bedford.
  south of Lynchburg. The highways travel concurrently to Lynchburg.
  in Lynchburg. The highways travel concurrently through Lynchburg.
  west-northwest of Farmville. The highways travel concurrently to south of Farmville.
  west of Burkeville. The highways travel concurrently to east of Burkeville.
  southwest of Petersburg. The highways travel concurrently to Petersburg.
  southwest of Petersburg
  in Petersburg. I-95/US 460 travels concurrently through Petersburg.
  in Petersburg
  southeast of Petersburg
  in Windsor
  in Suffolk. The highways travel concurrently to Chesapeake.
  in Chesapeake. The highways travel concurrently through Chesapeake.
  in Chesapeake
  in Chesapeake
  in Norfolk
  in Norfolk. The highways travel concurrently through Norfolk.
  in Norfolk
  in Norfolk
  in Norfolk
  in Norfolk

See also
Special routes of U.S. Route 460

References

External links

 Endpoints of U.S. Highway 460

60-4
60-4
4
60-4
60-4
60-4
60-4